The 1986 Atlanta Braves season was the 116th in franchise history and their 21st in Atlanta.

Offseason
 November 13, 1985: Randy Johnson was released by the Braves.
 December 6, 1985: Miguel Sosa (minors) was traded by the Braves to the New York Yankees for Billy Sample.
 March 5, 1986: Rick Cerone, David Clay (minors), and Flavio Alfaro (minors) were traded by the Braves to the Milwaukee Brewers for Ted Simmons.

Regular season

The Braves shutout the Montreal Expos, 6-0 in their season opener, but were 7-12 at the end of April, 6 1/2 games out of first. Atlanta won 17 of their first 25 games in the month of May, improving their record to 24–20 May 27. They were tied for second and were 1 1/2 games out of first.

On June 24 the Braves dropped into fourth place with a 34-36 record. They were in fourth place, 4 1/2 games out of first. Atlanta won seven of their next eight games to surge back into contention on July 3. Atlanta was 41-37 and in third place, 1 1/2 games out of first. The Braves promptly lost 20 of their next 25 games and fell into the cellar, 46-57, 12 1/2 games out of first. After a 12-5 run put them within 10 1/2 games of the lead, the Braves fizzled and faded down the stretch, losing their last five games to finish in last place with a 72-89 record, 23 1/2 games out of first.

The strong play of the Braves in the first half of the season was partly attributed to "The Bomb Squad", a group of six veterans who provided clutch hitting of the bench. The members of "The Bomb Squad" were: Ted Simmons, Chris Chambliss, Omar Moreno, Billy Sample, Bruce Benedict, and Andres Thomas. The name for the group was coined during spring training by Simmons in an effort to create unity among the bench players (Simmons, Moreno, and Sample were in their first season with the Braves). 

 July 6, 1986: In an 11-8 loss to the Montreal Expos, Bob Horner hit four home runs in one game. Horner became the second player in the 20th century (Gil Hodges was the first in 1950) to hit four home runs in one game in his home park. He became the first player since Ed Delahanty to hit four home runs in a losing game.

Season standings

Record vs. opponents

Notable transactions
 April 1, 1986: Pascual Pérez was released by the Braves.
 June 2, 1986: Ben McDonald was drafted by the Braves in the 27th round of the 1986 Major League Baseball draft, but did not sign.
 June 30, 1986: Claudell Washington and Paul Zuvella were traded by the Braves to the New York Yankees for Ken Griffey, Sr. and Andre Robertson.
 July 6, 1986: Duane Ward was traded by the Braves to the Toronto Blue Jays for Doyle Alexander.

Roster

Player stats

Batting

Starters by position
Note: Pos = Position; G = Games played; AB = At bats; H = Hits; Avg. = Batting average; HR = Home runs; RBI = Runs batted in

Other batters
Note: G = Games played; AB = At bats; H = Hits; Avg. = Batting average; HR = Home runs; RBI = Runs batted in

Pitching

Starting pitchers 
Note: G = Games pitched; IP = Innings pitched; W = Wins; L = Losses; ERA = Earned run average; SO = Strikeouts

Other pitchers 
Note: G = Games pitched; IP = Innings pitched; W = Wins; L = Losses; ERA = Earned run average; SO = Strikeouts

Relief pitchers 
Note: G = Games pitched; W = Wins; L = Losses; SV = Saves; ERA = Earned run average; SO = Strikeouts

Farm system 

LEAGUE CHAMPIONS: Richmond, Pulaski

Notes

References 
 1986 Atlanta Braves season at Baseball Reference
 Atlanta Braves on Baseball Almanac

Atlanta Braves seasons
Atlanta Braves season